The Waterloo Region municipal election, 2010 were held in the Regional Municipality of Waterloo of Ontario on October 25, 2010 in conjunction with municipal elections across the province.

Waterloo Regional Council

Chair

Council
Waterloo Regional Council includes the chair, the mayors of the seven constituent municipalities (see below) plus the following council races:

Plebiscite

(Vote only held in the City of Waterloo, and in the part of Woolwich and the small part of Kitchener that receive their water through the same system as Waterloo.)

Voters in Kitchener overwhelmingly supported the measure, while voters in Waterloo were overwhelmingly against it.

Cambridge

Kitchener

North Dumfries

Waterloo

Wellesley

Wilmot

Incumbent mayor Wayne Roth is not running again in 2010.

Woolwich

* = incumbent

References 

2010 Ontario municipal elections
Politics of the Regional Municipality of Waterloo